Chironex is a genus of box jellyfish in the family Chirodropidae. Their stings are highly venomous, and have caused human fatalities. Based on present knowledge, the genus is restricted to the central Indo-Pacific, ranging from southern Japan to northern Australia.

Species
The World Register of Marine Species lists the following species:
Chironex fleckeri Southcott, 1956 
Chironex indrasaksajiae Sucharitakul, 2017 
Chironex yamaguchii Lewis & Bentlage, 2009

References

Chirodropidae

Medusozoa genera